Kuy in Iran may refer to:
 Kuy-e Golestan
 Kuy-e Lotf
 Kuy-e Rah-e Haq
 Kuy-e Rowshan Shahr